Tahoe Maritime Museum is permanently closed..

hour.

See also
List of maritime museums in the United States

References

Museums in Placer County, California
Maritime museums in California